Brentford Football Club is a professional football club in Brentford, West London, England, which competes in the Premier League, the highest tier of English football, having gained promotion via the playoffs at the end of the 2020–21 Championship season. Nicknamed "The Bees”, the club was founded in 1889 and played home matches at Griffin Park from 1904 before moving to Gtech Community Stadium in 2020. Their main rivals are fellow West London-based clubs Fulham and Queens Park Rangers.

Brentford initially played amateur football before they entered the London League in 1896 and finished as runners-up of the Second Division and then the First Division to win election into the Southern League in 1898. They won the Southern League Second Division in 1900–01 and were elected into the Football League in 1920. Brentford won the Third Division South title in 1932–33 and the Second Division title in 1934–35. The club enjoyed a successful spell in the top flight of English football, reaching a peak of fifth in the First Division, in 1935–36, their highest ever league finish, before three relegations left them in the Fourth Division by 1962. They were crowned Fourth Division champions in 1962–63, but were relegated in 1966 and again in 1973 after gaining promotion in 1971–72. Brentford spent 14 seasons in the Third Division after gaining promotion in 1977–78 and went on to win the Third Division title in 1991–92, though were relegated again in 1993.

Brentford were relegated into the fourth tier in 1998 and won promotion as champions in the 1998–99 campaign. The club were relegated in 2007 and won promotion as champions of League Two in 2008–09 and then were promoted out of League One in 2013–14. They had unsuccessful Championship play-off campaigns in 2015 and 2020. Brentford have a poor record in finals, finishing as runners-up in three Associate Members' Cup/Football League Trophy finals (1985, 2001 and 2011) and losing four play-off finals (the 1997 Second Division final, 2002 Second Division final, 2013 League One final and 2020 Championship final). However, Brentford won the 2021 Championship final to be promoted to the highest level for the first time since the 1946–47 season.

History

Current and past grounds

 Clifden Road (1889–1891)
 Benn's Field (1891–1895)
 Shotter's Field (1895–1898)
 Cross Roads (1898–1900)
 York Road (1900–1904)
 Griffin Park (1904–2020)
 Gtech Community Stadium (2020–present)

Players

First team

 (on loan from Freiburg)

Out on loan

Brentford B

Coaching staff

As of 5 December 2022

First team

Brentford B

Management

As of 26 July 2022

Nickname
Brentford's nickname is "The Bees". The nickname was unintentionally created by students of Borough Road College in the 1890s, when they attended a match and shouted the college's chant "buck up Bs" in support of their friend and then-Brentford player Joseph Gettins. Local newspapers misheard the chant as "Buck up Bees" and the nickname stuck.

Colours and badge
Brentford's predominant home colours are a red and white striped shirt, black shorts and red or black socks. These have been the club's predominant home colours since the 1925–26 season, bar one season – 1960–61 – when yellow (gold) and blue were used, unsuccessfully. The colours on entering the Football League, in 1920–21, were white shirts, navy shorts and navy socks. Away kits have varied over the years, with the current colours being a yellow shirt with yellow shorts, both with black detailing, along with yellow socks. 

Brentford have had several badges on their shirts since it was formed in 1889. The first one, in 1893, was a white shield, with 'BFC' in blue and a wavy line in blue, which is thought to represent the river and the rowing club, who founded the football club. The next known badge, the Middlesex County Arms, was on shirts donated by a club supporter in 1909. The Brentford and Chiswick arms, as a badge, was used just for the one season, in 1938–39. The next badge was in 1971–72 when a shield, formed into quadrants, which had a hive and bees in one, 3 seaxes in another and the other two with red and white stripes. In 1972, the club organised a competition to design a new crest, which was won by Mr B.G. Spencer's design, a circle with a bee and stripes and the founding date of 1888. This was introduced in 1973 and used until May 1975, when it was brought to the club's attention, via Graham Haynes, that the club was formed in 1889 and not in 1888. Therefore a new badge, reputedly designed by Dan Tana – the club's chairman at the time – was introduced for the 1975–76 season and continued until 1994 when the current badge was introduced. In 2011 Russell Grant claimed to have designed the badge in a BBC interview, however it was in fact designed in 1993 for two season tickets by supporter Andrew Henning, following a request from Keith Loring the then chief executive. In 2017, the club redesigned its crest to a more modern, uncluttered, design with the flexibility for use in two tone colour print. The design is a double roundel with the club name and year founded in white on a red background and a large central bee.

Kit suppliers and shirt sponsors

Honours and best performances

League 

 Second Division / First Division / Championship (Tier 2)
 Champions (1): 1934–35
 Play-off winners (1): 2020–21
 Third Division / Second Division / League One (Tier 3)
 Champions (2): 1932–33 (South), 1991–92
Promoted (1): 2013–14
 Fourth Division / Third Division / League Two (Tier 4)
 Champions (3): 1962–63, 1998–99, 2008–09
 Southern League Second Division
Champions (1): 1900–01
London League First Division: 1
Promoted (1): 1897–98
London League Second Division: 1
Promoted (1): 1896–97
 West London Alliance: 1
Champions (1): 1892–93

Cups 
Middlesex Junior Cup: 1
1893–94
West Middlesex Cup: 1
 1894–95
 London Senior Cup: 1
1897–98
 Middlesex Senior Cup: 1
 1897–98
Southern Professional Charity Cup: 1
1908–09
Ealing Hospital Cup: 1
 1910–11
 London Challenge Cup: 3
 1934–35, 1964–65, 1966–67
London Charity Fund: 1
1928

Wartime honours 

 London Combination: 1
1918–19
 London War Cup: 1
 1941–42

Best performances

League

 First Division / Premier League (Tier 1)
 5th: 1935–36
 Western League
 2nd: 1904–05
 Southern League First Division
 9th: 1905–06

Cups

 FA Cup
 Sixth round/Quarter-finals: 1937–38, 1945–46, 1948–49, 1988–89
 Football League Cup
 Semi-finals: 2020–21
 Football League Trophy
 Runners-up: 1984–85, 2000–01, 2010–11
 Empire Exhibition Trophy
 First round: 1938
 Southern Professional Floodlit Cup
 Semi-finals: 1955–56, 1956–57
 First Alliance Cup
 First round: 1988

Awards

Football League Awards
 Community Club of the Year (2): 2005–06, 2013–14
 League Two Community Club of the Year (1): 2008–09
 Best Club Sponsorship (1): 2006–07
 Family Excellence Award (8): 2007–08, 2009–10, 2010–11, 2011–12, 2012–13, 2013–14, 2014–15, 2015–16
Stadium Business Awards
 Sponsorship, Sales and Marketing (1): 2013
Littlewoods Giant Killers Award
2–1 vs Norwich City, FA Cup third round, 6 January 1996

Rivalries

Brentford's main rivals are Fulham and Queens Park Rangers. The club have a long standing rivalry with Fulham. In the past this fixture has been marred by crowd violence. Brentford's rivalry with Queens Park Rangers intensified in 1967, when Rangers failed in an attempted takeover of the Bees, a move which, had it succeeded, would have seen Rangers move into Griffin Park and Brentford quit the Football League. As with the Fulham rivalry, this fixture sees passions run high amongst both sets of supporters with local pride at stake.

International links
In February 2013, it was announced that Brentford had entered into partnership with Icelandic 1. deild karla club UMF Selfoss, which would enable Brentford to send youth and development squad players to Iceland to gain experience. The partnership also sees the two clubs exchanging coaching philosophies and allows Brentford to utilise UMF Selfoss' scouting network. In May 2013, the Brentford staff forged links with Ugandan lower league club Gulu United as part of the "United for United" project, aimed at forming the region's first youth training camp and identifying talented players. Brentford owner Matthew Benham became majority shareholder in Danish club FC Midtjylland in 2014 and the staff of both clubs share ideas.

Affiliated clubs
  FC Midtjylland − Sister club 
  London Tigers
  UMF Selfoss
  Gulu United

Celebrity connections
 Brentford FC is mentioned often on the BBC comedy People Just Do Nothing. DJ Beats often wears a Brentford jacket, and Angel's room is full of Brentford memorabilia. 
 Actor and comedian Bradley Walsh was a professional at the club in the late 1970s, but never made the first team squad.
 Dan Tana, Hollywood actor and restaurateur, served on the club's board and was chairman.
 Model Stephen James played for the club's youth team prior to his release in 2008.
 Entertainer Vic Oliver served as the club's vice-president in the early 1950s and was later president of the Brentford Supporters' Club.
 Politician Jack Dunnett served as club chairman between 1961 and 1967.
Rick Wakeman became a director of the club for a year in 1979.
Radiohead guitarist Ed O'Brien has been a supporter and season ticket holder at Brentford Football Club
Status Quo bass player John "Rhino" Edwards is a massive fan of Brentford, he wrote and recorded a song for a Brentford player Lloyd Owusu.

Notes

References

External links

  of Brentford F.C.
  of Bees United – The Brentford Supporters' Trust (owners of the majority of shares in the club)
  of BIAS – Brentford Independent Association of Supporters

 
1889 establishments in England
Association football clubs established in 1889
Brentford, London
Football clubs in England
Football clubs in London
Premier League clubs
Southern Football League clubs
Sport in the London Borough of Hounslow
Former English Football League clubs